The Layland-Barratt Baronetcy, of the Manor House in the Borough of Torquay and of Tregarne Lodge in the Parish of St Austell in the County of Cornwall, was a title in the Baronetage of the United Kingdom. It was created on 23 July 1908 for Francis Layland-Barratt, Liberal Member of Parliament for Torquay and St Austell. The title became extinct on the death of the second Baronet in 1968.

Layland-Barratt baronets, of the Manor House and of Tregarne Lodge (1908)
Sir Francis Layland-Barratt, 1st Baronet (1860–1933)
Sir Francis Henry Godolphin Layland-Barratt, 2nd Baronet (1896–1968)

References

Extinct baronetcies in the Baronetage of the United Kingdom